The teams competing in Group 7 of the 2009 UEFA European Under-21 Championship qualifying competition are Austria, Belgium, Cyprus, Iceland, and Slovakia.

Standings

Key:
Pts Points, Pld Matches played, W Won, D Drawn, L Lost, GF Goals for, GA Goals against, GD Goal Difference

Matches

Match originally ended 1–1. Later awarded as 3–0 forfeit win to Slovakia as Belgium fielded an ineligible player.

Goalscorers

1 goal
: Harun Erbek, Niklas Hoheneder, Florian Klein, Michale Madl, Rubin Okotie, Marco Stankovic
: Alessandro Cordaro, Roland Lamah, Jonathan Legear, Jeanvion Yulu-Matondo
: Menelaos Aristidou, Georgios Panagi, Elias Vattis
: Rúrik Gíslason, Gylfi Sigurðsson, Arnar Smárason, Bjarni Viðarsson
: Matej Ižvolt, Erik Jendrišek, Ján Maslo, Lukás Opiela, Peter Pekarík, Pavol Pilar, Miroslav Stoch, Vladimír Weiss

Group 7